Honor Reigns Supreme 2019 was a professional wrestling event produced by Ring of Honor (ROH), that took place on January 13, 2019, at the Cabarrus Arena in Concord, North Carolina.  The event was shown live on ROH's Honor Club online streaming service.

Storylines
Honor Reigns Supreme 2019 features professional wrestling matches, which involve different wrestlers from pre-existing scripted feuds, plots, and storylines that play out on ROH's television programs. Wrestlers portray villains or heroes as they follow a series of events that build tension and culminate in a wrestling match or series of matches.

Results

See also
2019 in professional wrestling
List of Ring of Honor pay-per-view events

References

External links
Ring of Honor's official website

2019 in professional wrestling
2019 in North Carolina
Events in North Carolina
Events in Concord, North Carolina
Professional wrestling in North Carolina
January 2019 events in the United States